Barbatula quignardi, the Languedoc stone loach, is a species of ray-finned fish in the genus Barbatula.

Environment
Fresh waters. Found in the drainage of Ebro, Bidasoa and Nervión in Spain and Lez, Tech, Adour and Garonne drainages in France

References

External links 
 

quignardi
Fish of Europe
Fish described in 1967